Coon songs were a genre of music that presented a stereotype of black people. They were popular in the United States and Australia from around 1880 to 1920, though the earliest such songs date from minstrel shows as far back as 1848, when they were not yet identified with "coon" epithet. The genre became extremely popular, with white and black men giving performances in blackface and making recordings. Women known as coon shouters also gained popularity in the genre.

Rise and fall from popularity
Although the word "coon" is now regarded as racist, according to Stuart Flexner, "coon" was short for "raccoon", and it meant a frontier rustic (someone who may wear a coonskin cap) by 1832.  By 1840 it also meant a Whig as the Whig Party was keen to be associated with rural white common people. At that time, "coon" was typically used to refer someone white, and a coon song referred to a Whig song. it was only in 1848 when the first clear case of using "coon" to refer to a black person in a derogative sense appeared. It is possible that the negative racial connotation of the word may have evolved from "Zip Coon", a song that first became popular in the 1830s, and the common use of the word "coon" in blackface minstrel shows. The song "Zip Coon", a variant of "Turkey in the Straw", notably in performances by George Washington Dixon who performed in blackface, was published around 1834.  The word "coon" meaning "black person", was in use by 1837. An alternative suggestion of the word's origin to mean a black person is that it was derived from barracoon, an enclosure for slaves, which became increasingly used in the years before the American Civil War as temporary enclosure for slaves escaping or traveling. It may also have been used earlier on the stage; a black man named Raccoon was one of the lead characters in a 1767 colonial comic opera "The Disappointment". Whatever the origin, by 1862, "coon" had come to mean a black person. The first explicitly coon-themed song, published in 1880, may have been "The Dandy Coon's Parade" by J. P. Skelley.  Other notable early coon songs included "The Coons Are on Parade", "New Coon in Town" (by J. S. Putnam, 1883), "Coon Salvation Army" (by Sam Lucas, 1884), "Coon Schottische" (by William Dressler, 1884). The most popular coon songs of this early period, however, were written by whites, and only one, "New Coon in Town", has enough syncopation "to foreshadow the true, shouting, ragtime school". Black Americans had also entered the music business by this time, and their syncopated music then came to be identified with real coon songs. By the mid-1880s, coon songs were a national craze; over 600 such songs were published in the 1890s.  The most successful songs sold millions of copies.  To take advantage of the fad, composers "add[ed] words typical of coon songs to previously published songs and rags". The first hit recorded song by a black man was "The Whistling Coon" by George W. Johnson recorded in 1890. After the turn of the century, coon songs began to receive criticism for their racist content.  In 1905, Bob Cole, an African-American composer who had gained fame largely by writing coon songs, made somewhat unprecedented remarks about the genre. When asked in an interview about the name of his earlier comedy A Trip to Coontown, he replied, "That day has passed with the softly flowing tide of revelations." In 1908 the Broadway company Cinemaphone, created by J. A. Whitman, released a short film "Coon Song" which had an audible track featuring singers such as Blanche Ring, Anna Held, Eva Tanguay and Stella Mayhew. Following further criticism, the use of "coon" in song titles greatly decreased after 1910. On August 13, 1920, Marcus Garvey's Universal Negro Improvement Association and African Communities League created the red, black and green flag as a response to the song "Every Race Has a Flag but the Coon" by Heelan and Helf. That song along with "Coon, Coon, Coon" and "All Coons Look Alike to Me" were identified by H. L. Mencken as being the three songs which firmly established the derogatory term "coon" in the American vocabulary. Originally in the 1830s, the term had been associated with the Whig Party. The Whigs used a raccoon as its emblem, but the party also developed a more tolerant attitude towards blacks than the other political factions. The latter opinion is likely what transformed the term "coon" from mere political slang into a racial slur. It is possible that the popularity of coon songs may be explained in part by their historical timing: coon songs arose precisely as the popular music business exploded in Tin Pan Alley. However, James Dormon, a former professor of history and American studies at the University of Southwestern Louisiana, has also suggested that coon songs can be seen as "a necessary sociopsychological mechanism for justifying segregation and subordination."  The songs portrayed blacks as posing a threat to the American social order and implied that they had to be controlled.

Composers
 
At the height of their popularity, "just about every songwriter in the country" was writing coon songs "to fill the seemingly insatiable demand".  Writers of coon songs included some of the most important Tin Pan Alley composers, including Gus Edwards, Fred Fisher (who wrote the 1905 "If the Man in the Moon Were a Coon", which sold three million copies), and Irving Berlin.  Even one of John Philip Sousa's assistants, Arthur Pryor, composed coon songs.  (This was meant to ensure a steady supply to Sousa's band, which performed the songs and popularized several coon song melodies.) Many coon songs were written by whites, but some were written by blacks.  Important black composers of coon songs include Ernest Hogan (who wrote "All Coons Look Alike to Me", the most famous coon song); Sam Lucas (who wrote the most racist early coon songs by modern standards); minstrel and songwriter Sidney L. Perrin (who wrote "Black Annie," "Dat's De Way to Spell Chicken," "Mamma's Little Pumpkin Colored Coons," "Gib Me Ma 15 Cents," and "My Dinah"); Bob Cole (who wrote dozens of songs, including "I Wonder What the Coon's Game Is?" and "No Coons Allowed"); and Bert Williams and George Walker.  Even classic ragtime composer Scott Joplin wrote at least one coon song ("I Am Thinking of My Pickaninny Days"), and may have composed the music for several more, using lyrics written by others.

Characteristics
Coon songs almost always aimed to be funny and incorporated the syncopated rhythms of ragtime music.  A coon song's defining characteristic, however, was its caricature of African Americans. In keeping with the older minstrel image of blacks, coon songs often featured "watermelon- and chicken-loving rural buffoon[s]".  However, "blacks began to appear as not only ignorant and indolent, but also devoid of honesty or personal honor, given to drunkenness and gambling, utterly without ambition, sensuous, libidinous, even lascivious."  Blacks were portrayed as making money through gambling, theft, and hustling, rather than working to earn a living, as in the Nathan Bivins song "Gimme Ma Money":

Last night I did go to a big Crap game,
How dem coons did gamble wuz a sin and a shame...
I'm gambling for my Sadie,
Cause she's my lady,
I'm a hustling coon, ... dat's just what I am.

Coon songs portrayed blacks as "hot", in this context meaning promiscuous and libidinous.  They suggested that the most common living arrangement was a "honey" relationship (unmarried cohabitation), rather than marriage. Blacks were portrayed as inclined toward acts of provocative violence.  Razors were often featured in the songs and came to symbolize blacks' wanton tendencies.  However, violence in the songs was uniformly directed at blacks instead of whites (perhaps to discharge the threatening notion of black violence amongst the coon songs' predominantly white consumers).  Hence, the spectre of black-on-white violence remained but an allusion. The street-patrolling "bully coon" was often used as a stock character in coon songs. The songs showed the social threats that whites believed were posed by blacks.  Passing was a common theme, and blacks were portrayed as seeking the status of whites, through education and money.  However, blacks rarely, except during dream sequences, actually succeeded at appearing white; they only aspired to do so.

Use in theater

Coon songs were popular in vaudeville theater, where they were delivered by "coon shouters", who were typically White women.  Notable coon shouters included Artie Hall, Sophie Tucker, May Irwin, Mae West, Fanny Brice, Fay Templeton, Lotta Crabtree,  Marie Dressler, Emma Carus, Nora Bayes, Blanche Ring, Clarice Vance, Elsie Janis, Trixie Friganza, Eva Tanguay and Julia Gerity. As with minstrel shows earlier, a whole genre of skits and shows grew up around coon songs, and often coon songs were featured in legitimate theater productions.

Effects on African-American music
Coon songs contributed to the development and acceptance of authentic African-American music.  Elements from coon songs were incorporated into turn-of-the-century African-American folk songs, as was revealed by Howard W. Odum's 1906–1908 ethnomusicology fieldwork.  Similarly, coon songs' lyrics influenced the vocabulary of the blues, culminating with Bessie Smith's singing in the 1920s. Black songwriters and performers who participated in the creation of coon songs profited commercially, enabling them to go on to develop a new type of African American musical theater based at least in part on African-American traditions. Coon songs also contributed to the mainstream acceptance of ragtime music, paving the way for the acceptance of other African-American music.  Ernest Hogan, when discussing his "All Coons Look Alike to Me" shortly before his death, commented:

See also
 African-American stereotypes
 Blackface
 Sherman H. Dudley

References

Works cited
 
 Blesh, Rudi and Harris, Janet; "They All Played Ragtime"; Alfred P. Knopf;  New York:  1950.
 Chude-Sokei, Louis; "The Last 'Darky: Bert Williams, Black-on-Black Minstrelsy, and the African Diaspora; Duke University Press Books; Durham, North Carolina: 2006. 288p. .
 
 Hamm, Charles. "Genre, Performance and Ideology in the Early Songs of Irving Berlin." Popular Music 13: 143-150 (1994).
 Hubbard-Brown, Janet; "Scott Joplin: Composer"; Chelsea House; New York: 2006.  
 Mencken, H.L. "Designations for Colored Folk" in Knickerbocker, William Skinkle, Twentieth Century English, Ayer Publishing (1970).
 Lemons, J. Stanley. "Black Stereotypes as Reflected in Popular Culture, 1880-1920." American Quarterly 29: 102-116 (1977).
 Peress, Maurice. "Dvorak to Duke Ellington: A Conductor Explores America's Music and Its African American Roots" Oxford University Press (2003).
 
 Reublin, Richard A. and Robert L. Maine.  "Question of the Month: What Were Coon Songs?"  Jim Crow Museum of Racist Memorabilia website, Ferris State University (May 2005).
 Sotiroupoulos, Karen. "Staging Race: Black Performers in Turn of the century America", Harvard University Press (2006).
 Stras, Laurie; "White Face, Black Voice: Race, Gender, and Region, in the Music of the Boswell Sisters", in Journal of the Society for American Music; Vol 1:Issue 2; May 2007, pp 207–255. Cambridge University Press, Cambridge, UK.

External links
 Detroit Public Library E. Azalia Hackley Collection of African Americans in the Performing Arts (Featuring Songs of this Genre)

African-American cultural history
African-American history between emancipation and the civil rights movement
Stereotypes of African Americans
American music history
19th-century music genres
20th-century music genres
American styles of music
Vaudeville songs
 
Anti-African and anti-black slurs